Grand Bassam Zion Rock is a 1996 reggae album by the Ivorian artist Alpha Blondy.

Track listing

Personnel
Alpha Blondy – lead vocals

References

1996 albums
Alpha Blondy albums